Prakash Chandra Das (born 27 November 1958) is a politician of  Bharatiya Janata Party from the state of  Tripura,  India. He is a former Minister in the INC-TUJS coalition government that governed the state of Tripura between 1988-1993 and three time MLA. He contested as an Indian National Congress candidate from the Bamutia(SC) constituency six times consecutively from 1988 to 2013 winning thrice, in 1988, 1998 and 2003.

Early life

He was born on 27 November 1958. He did his graduation of Bachelor of Arts in History from Maharaja Bir Bikram College, then under the University of Calcutta.

Political Activities

He got involved in politics at a young age through National Students' Union of India in student politics. He contested as an Indian National Congress candidate in the 1988 assembly elections from 3-Bamutia assembly constituency where he defeated the Communist Party of India (Marxist) candidate and was also a minister in the INC-TUJS alliance that governed the state from 1988-1993. He won again from the same constituency in 1998 and in 2003. He served as Vice-President of pradesh youth congress, Tripura Pradesh Congress Committee General Secretary, member of All India Congress Committee. He was also the chairman of Tripura Pradesh Congress Committee SC Department from 2004 till he resigned from the party in June, 2016. He was declared as the Vice-President of Tripura Pradesh Trinamool Congress. He quit trinamool and joined BJP on April, 2017. He rejoined INC in March 2019. He quit INC and joined AITC in July, 2021.

Other Activities

He is very active in matters related to upliftment of Scheduled Castes and Scheduled Tribes and in bringing equality to them and economically empowering them. He is the President of Dr. B.R. Ambedkar Smriti Jan Kalyan Sanstha, a Non-governmental organization.

References 

Tripura politicians
Trinamool Congress politicians
Living people
1958 births
Bharatiya Janata Party politicians from Tripura